Linhe is a town under the administration of Lingwu, Ningxia, China. , it has seven villages under its administration.

It is the site of the Yinchuan Hedong Airport.

References 

Township-level divisions of Ningxia
Lingwu